Yaroslav Vadymovych Paniot (born 26 December 1997) is a Ukrainian-American figure skater who competes for the United States. He is the 2021 U.S. national pewter medalist.

Representing Ukraine, he is the 2017 CS Tallinn Trophy bronze medalist, the 2017 Philadelphia International silver medalist, and a two-time Ukrainian national champion (2014, 2017). He has reached the free skate at four ISU Championships and qualified a spot for Ukraine at the 2018 Winter Olympics, where he finished 30th. He last competed for Ukraine in November 2018.

Career

Early career 
Paniot began skating in 2003. In his early years, he was taught by Yuriy Sukholentsev and Oleksandr Zelensky in Ukraine. From 2009 to 2011, he was coached by Alexei Tchetverukhin in Russia.

In January 2012, Paniot won silver in the team event at the Winter Youth Olympics in Innsbruck, Austria. He debuted on the ISU Junior Grand Prix (JGP) series the following season, in late August 2012. In February 2013, Paniot took silver at the European Youth Olympic Winter Festival in Poiana Brașov, Romania. He trained mainly in Kyiv until 2014.

2014–2015 season: ISU Championship debut
During the season, Paniot trained mainly in Irvine, California, coached by Viacheslav Zagorodniuk. Competing in the 2014 JGP series, he finished 17th in Aichi, Japan, having dropped from 7th after the short program, and won the bronze medal in Dresden, Germany, after placing fourth in the short and third in the free skate. Making his senior international debut, he finished 12th at the Warsaw Cup, an ISU Challenger Series event. In December, Paniot won the Ukrainian senior national title; ranked first in the short program and second in the free skate, he finished ahead of silver medalist Ivan Pavlov by less than half a point.

Paniot was selected to compete at two senior-level ISU Championships and reached the free skate at both. In January, he finished 16th at the 2015 European Championships in Stockholm, Sweden, having ranked 14th in the short program and 18th in the free skate. In March, he placed 20th in the short, 24th in the free, and 24th overall at the 2015 World Championships in Shanghai, China.

2015–2016 season
Paniot finished second to Pavlov at the Ukrainian Championships in December 2015. He changed coaches in January 2016, joining Nikolai Morozov a week before the Ukrainian Junior Championships. In March, he competed at the 2016 World Junior Championships in Debrecen, Hungary and qualified for the free skate by placing 15th in the short. He was 8th in the free skate and 11th overall.

2016–2017 season
Competing in the 2016 JGP series, Paniot placed 5th in Saint Gervais-les-Bains and Dresden. He ranked 12th at the 2016 CS Golden Spin of Zagreb. At the Ukrainian Championships, he placed first in the short and second in the free, finishing second to Pavlov by a margin of 0.87.

Ahead of the 2017 World Junior Championships, Paniot trained under Halyna Kukhar and Anton Kovalevski in Ukraine. At Junior Worlds in Taipei (Taiwan), Paniot finished in 10th place after scoring personal bests in every portion of the competition.

2017–2018 season 
In early August, Paniot received the silver medal at the Philadelphia Summer International, having finished second to Timothy Dolensky and ahead of Max Aaron. In mid-September, he placed fourth at the 2017 CS U.S. International Classic. At the end of the month, he competed at the 2017 CS Nebelhorn Trophy, the final qualifying opportunity for the 2018 Winter Olympics. By placing 7th, he earned a spot for Ukraine in the men's event at the Olympics.

Paniot won bronze at the 2017 CS Tallinn Trophy and then won his second senior national title. In February 2018, he competed at the 2018 Winter Olympics in PyeongChang, South Korea. He was eliminated after placing 30th in the short program.

2018–2019 season 
Paniot placed eighth at the 2018 CS U.S. International Figure Skating Classic. In November, he made his Grand Prix debut, placing 12th at the 2018 NHK Trophy. It was his final international appearance for Ukraine.

2019–2020 season  
Paniot competed at the 2020 Southwest Regionals, finishing third in the short and second in the free to come in second overall and qualify for Sectionals. At the 2020 Pacific Coast Sectionals, he was first after the short and third in the free, coming in second overall, only .88 behind the winner, Joonsoo Kim. This qualified him for Nationals. In his US Nationals debut, Paniot finished ninth in the short and tenth in the free, to place tenth overall at the 2020 U.S. Championships.

2020–2021 season
Paniot competed in the virtual Championship Series, placing second in his group and second overall behind Eric Sjoberg. This qualified him for his second consecutive national championship.  Competing at the 2021 U.S. Championships, he placed fourth in the short program with a clean skate.  In the free program, he landed three quads and placed third in that segment, remaining in fourth place overall and taking the pewter medal.

In an interview following the national championships, Paniot said he would be released from the Ukrainian federation on May 21, 2021, and would be eligible to compete for the United States the following season. He also said he expected to receive American citizenship in late 2021, making him eligible to compete at the 2022 Winter Olympics in Beijing.

2021–2022 season
In early June, Paniot was officially added to the USFSA's International Selection Pool roster. Paniot was fourth at the Skating Club of Boston's Cranberry Cup, a small international competition. Paniot was named as the host pick for the 2021 Skate America in September. He was slated to compete at the 2021 CS Lombardia Trophy but withdrew during the short program due to boot issues. He later withdrew from Skate America as well.

Paniot placed seventh in the short program at the 2022 U.S. Championships but had to withdraw from the free skate after suffering another problem with his boots.

Records and achievements 
 The first European skater to have completed a quad flip in international competition. He landed the jump in his free skate at the 2017 US International Figure Skating Classic.

Programs

Competitive highlights 
GP: Grand Prix; CS: Challenger Series; JGP: Junior Grand Prix. Pewter medals (4th place) awarded only at U.S. national, sectional, and regional events.

For the United States

For Ukraine

References

External links 
 

1997 births
Ukrainian male single skaters
Living people
Sportspeople from Odesa
Figure skaters at the 2018 Winter Olympics
Olympic figure skaters of Ukraine
Figure skaters at the 2012 Winter Youth Olympics